Vishwanath Patil is an Indian politician and member of the Bharatiya Janata Party. Patil was a member of the Karnataka Legislative Assembly from the Bailhongal constituency in Belgaum district on Karnataka Jantha Paksha.

References 

People from Belagavi district
Bharatiya Janata Party politicians from Karnataka
Karnataka MLAs 2013–2018
Living people
21st-century Indian politicians
Karnataka politicians
Year of birth missing (living people)
Karnataka Janata Paksha politicians